Douglas Jefferies (1884–1959) was a British stage and film actor.

Selected filmography
 A Safe Affair (1931) - Henry
 Channel Crossing (1933) - Dr. Walkley
 What Happened to Harkness? (1934) - (uncredited)
 The Cardinal (1936) - Baglioni
 While the Sun Shines (1947) - The Duke of Ayr and Stirling
 The Loves of Joanna Godden (1947) - Huggett
 Frieda (1947) - Hobson
 The Long Dark Hall (1951) - Dr. Conway

Selected stage roles
 Lean Harvest by Ronald Jeans (1931)
Victoria Regina by Laurence Housman (1937)
 While the Sun Shines by Terence Rattigan (1943)
 Cry Liberty by Esther McCracken (1950)
 The Seventh Veil by Sydney Box (1951)

References

Bibliography
 Christopher Murray. Sean O'Casey: Writer at Work, a Biography. Gill & Macmillan, 2004.

External links

1884 births
1959 deaths
British male film actors
British male stage actors
British male television actors